"Don't Go" is a single written, produced and sung by Marlon Jackson, from his solo debut album Baby Tonight. The song was released as the album's second and final single on September 7, 1987 by Capitol Records. On the Billboard Hot Black Singles chart, it peaked at No. 2. It was also his second and final single.

Charts

References

1987 songs
1987 singles
Marlon Jackson songs
Capitol Records singles